Pardon is a 2005 Turkish comedy film.

Plot

Production 
Some sequences of the film were shot in Sinop Fortress Prison.

Cast 
Ferhan Şensoy - İbrahim
Rasim Öztekin - Muzo(Muzaffer)
Ali Çatalbaş - Aydın Diktepe
Erol Günaydın - İbrahim'in babası
Sermiyan Midyat - İbrahim'in Eniştesi
Parkan Özturan - Gardiyan Osman
Hakan Bilgin - Taksi Şoförü
Zeki Alasya - Hapishane müdürü
Bülent Kayabaş - Emniyet Amiri

References

External links 

2005 films
2005 black comedy films
Turkish black comedy films
2005 comedy films